Brenda Vera Amelia Lupton-Christian (born February 25, 1953) is a political figure from the Pacific territory of the Pitcairn Islands. When her brother Steve Christian was removed from the office of mayor following the 2004 Pitcairn child sexual abuse trial, she served as interim mayor of the islands.

Biography
Christian was born and raised on Pitcairn and is the daughter of former island political leader Ivan Christian and his wife Verna Carlene "Dobrey" Young. She lived in the United Kingdom for a time, but returned to the island around 1999 and has served as the island's sole police officer. Except for 2003, she has been a member of the Island Council continuously since 2000.

She stood for election in her own right, but in the special election held on 15 December, she was defeated by Jay Warren, the former Magistrate (whose office was renamed Mayor in 1999 following a constitutional revision). Her stated goal as mayor of the Pitcairn Islands was to make the islands a more attractive destination for tourism.

In 2004 Brenda Christian served the territory as its first female Mayor from 8 November to 15 December 2004. She was appointed to the Mayoralty in an interim capacity by the Island Council, following her brother Steve Christian's dismissal by the colonial Governor, in the wake of his child rape convictions on 30 October 2004.

Ancestry

See also

 Politics of the Pitcairn Islands
 Law enforcement in the Pitcairn Islands

References

Living people
1953 births
Pitcairn Islands people
Pitcairn Islands people of Saint Kitts and Nevis descent
Pitcairn Islands people of English descent
Pitcairn Islands people of Manx descent
Pitcairn Islands people of Polynesian descent
Pitcairn Islands people of Scottish descent
Pitcairn Islands people of Cornish descent
Pitcairn Islands people of American descent
Mayors of the Pitcairn Islands
Pitcairn Islands Seventh-day Adventists
21st-century British women politicians
Members of the Island Council of the Pitcairn Islands
Law enforcement in the Pitcairn Islands